Cornelius Kipng'eno Arap Korir (6 July 1950 – 30 October 2017) was a prelate of the Roman Catholic Church who served as Bishop of the Diocese of Eldoret.

He was born in Segutiet village, Bomet District, in the former Rift Valley Province of Kenya. He was ordained a priest in 1982. Arap Korir was consecrated as bishop of the Diocese of Eldoret, Kenya on 2 June 1990 and served there until his death on 30 October 2017.

Bishop Korir presided over the church at a time of many turbulent times in the North Rift during the 1992, 1997, 2007/08 Kenyan post-election violence, and he played a major role in peace-building and uniting the communities living in this area. He received the distinguished service medal in recognition of this work, bestowed upon him by President Mwai Kibaki.

During his tenure, the church witnessed a sharp increase in church membership, and development of health and education institutions sponsored by the Roman Catholic church within the Diocese of Eldoret.

Life

Bishop Cornelius Kipng'eno Arap Korir was born on 6 July 1950 in Segutiet Village, Bomet District, Kericho Dioceses in Rift Valley Province. Korir started schooling at Chesoen and Segutiet primary school until 1970. He later joined Mother of Apostles Minor seminary Eldoret and St. Augustine Major Seminary in Bungoma between 1971 and 1976. Kipng'eno Arap Korir obtained a diploma in the philosophy of religious studies in 1982. He was also awarded a diploma in theology from St. Thomas Aquinas major seminary, Nairobi. He continued schooling and was awarded a degree in sacred theology by St. Patrick's College in Maynooth, Ireland in 1989. He was ordained as a priest on 6 November 1982. He was first appointed a bishop on 7 April 1990. Until his death on 30 October 2017, he was a bishop at the Catholic diocese of Eldoret where he served from 2 June 1990. He first came to wider notice after mediating between Marakwet and Pokot clashes at Kapsait, where he managed to build a church as a symbol of unity. In 1997 and 2007/08, he interceded in mediating peace among several communities that clashed due to election issues. He is believed to have housed more than 10,000 families affected by post-election violence that erupted in December 2007 and lasted through February 2008. In his mission of uniting, Korir wrote a book titled Amani Mashinani where he featured how he managed to unite communities. He has earned two awards through his mission of restoring peace in Turkana, Marakwet and Pokot. He first received a distinguished medal, Moran of the Burning Spear which was awarded by former president Mwai Kibaki. In 2009, he received the Milele Lifetime award which was given by the National Commission of Human Rights. The peace ambassador was able to start a radio station in the cathedral church of Eldoret and named it Upendo FM (meaning "love") in 2013. He died in his house on the morning of Monday 30 October 2017. He was diagnosed with high blood pressure and diabetes which were not detected for a long time. He was buried inside the cathedral as the first bishop in the region to have died in the line of duty.

See also
Catholic Church in Kenya

References

External links
 Bishop Cornelius Kipng’eno Arap Korir at Catholic-Hierarchy.org 

21st-century Roman Catholic bishops in Kenya
People from Bomet County
2017 deaths
1950 births
20th-century Roman Catholic bishops in Kenya
Roman Catholic bishops of Eldoret
Kenyan Roman Catholic bishops